Combustion Theory and Modelling is a bimonthly peer-reviewed scientific journal covering research on combustion. The editors-in-chief are Moshe Matalon (University of Illinois at Urbana–Champaign) and Mitchell D. Smooke (Yale University). It is published by Taylor & Francis and was established in 1997. The founding editors are John W. Dold and Mitchell D. Smooke.

Abstracting and indexing
The journal is abstracted and indexed in,

According to the Journal Citation Reports, the journal has a 2020 impact factor of 1.777.

See also

References

External links

Taylor & Francis academic journals
Chemistry journals
Physics journals
English-language journals
Engineering journals
Combustion
Publications established in 1997
Bimonthly journals